A statue is a sculpture representing one or more people or animals.

Statue or The Statue may also refer to:

Film and TV
 :fr:La Statue, a French silent film
 The Statue (1913 film), a 1913 short comedy film
 The Statue (1971 film), a 1971 British film comedy starring David Niven, Robert Vaughn and Virna Lisi
 The Statue (Seinfeld), an episode of the U.S. sitcom Seinfeld
 "The Statue", episode in the seventh season of The Andy Griffith Show
 "The Statue", season three episode of The Waltons
 The Statue (opera), (La Statue) a 19th-century opera

Games
 Statues (game), a children's game

Music
 La statue, an opera by Ernest Reyer

Albums
 Statues (album), a 2003 album by Moloko

Songs
 Statues (2020 song), by Amy Macdonald from Human Demands
 "Statues", a song by Orchestral Manoeuvres in the Dark from Organisation
 "Statues", a song by Hüsker Dü from Everything Falls Apart
 "The Statue", a song by Don MacLean from Prime Time
 "Statue", a song by Immaculate Machine from Ones and Zeros
 "Statues", a song by Death From Above 1979 from Outrage! Is Now
 "Statue", a song by Lil' Eddie from City of My Heart

See also 
 Statue, National Museum of Iran 2401, a main work of Parthian art
 List of statues
 
 Sculpture (disambiguation)